Olga Kazi (born 10 May 1941 in Kispest, Budapest) is a retired female middle distance runner from Hungary. She is a multiple Hungarian Athletics Championships winner, having collected two gold medals in 400 metres, five on 800 metres and one each in 1500 metres and cross country running. In addition Kazi twice represented her native country at the Summer Olympics: in 1960 and 1964. She set her personal best in the women's 800 metres (2:05.0) on 16 September 1962 at the European Championships in Belgrade.

Personal life
Kazi married to fellow Olympian István Gyulai, with whom she had two children, Miklós and Márton.

References

External links
Track and Field Statistics

1941 births
Living people
Athletes from Budapest
Hungarian female middle-distance runners
Athletes (track and field) at the 1960 Summer Olympics
Athletes (track and field) at the 1964 Summer Olympics
Olympic athletes of Hungary
European Athletics Championships medalists
Universiade medalists in athletics (track and field)
Universiade gold medalists for Hungary
Medalists at the 1963 Summer Universiade
20th-century Hungarian women
21st-century Hungarian women